Maiestas trifasciatus (formerly Recilia trifasciatus) is a species of bug from the Cicadellidae family that can be found on Canary Islands and countries including Iran and Burkina Faso. It was formerly placed within Recilia, but a 2009 revision moved it to Maiestas.

References

Hemiptera of Africa
Hemiptera of Asia
Maiestas